Dolné Strháre is a village and municipality in the Veľký Krtíš District of the Banská Bystrica Region of southern Slovakia.

History
In historical records, the village was first mentioned in 1244 (1244 Stergar, 1247 Strugar, 1243 Estergur, Vzturgar, 1260 Strogar), as a royal dominion. In 1260 it was given to the chief Mattheus from Bratislava and after to Divín castle. From 1554 to 1594 it was under Turkish domination. In the 17th century it belonged to Modrý Kameň.

Genealogical resources

The records for genealogical research are available at the state archive "Statny Archiv in Banska Bystrica, Slovakia"
 Roman Catholic church records (births/marriages/deaths): 1754-1896 (parish B)
 Lutheran church records (births/marriages/deaths): 1786-1836 (parish A)
 Reformated church records (births/marriages/deaths): 1800-1896 (parish B)

See also
 List of municipalities and towns in Slovakia

References

External links
 
 
 https://web.archive.org/web/20071116010355/http://www.statistics.sk/mosmis/eng/run.html
 http://www.e-obce.sk/obec/dolnestrhare/dolne-strhare.html
 Surnames of living people in Dolne Strhare

Villages and municipalities in Veľký Krtíš District